Confusion Unlimited is the debut album by Canadian singer-songwriter Kate Maki, released in 2003. The album was released independently with distribution by Outside Music.

Guest musicians on the album include Jim Bryson, Ryan Bishops, Dan Levecque and Fred Guignion.

The song "Strangest Dream" was featured in the film, Wilby Wonderful from 2004, and the song "All Things Passed" was featured in Episode 103 of the television series MVP (TV series) from 2008.

Track listing
 "Over"
 "Out Back"
 "Strangest Dream"
 "Many Thanks"
 "Mid March Blues"
 "To Be Good"
 "Home"
 "All Things Passed"
 "Miles from Nowhere"

2003 albums
Kate Maki albums